Portersville may refer to:
Portersville, Connecticut, former village in Mystic, Connecticut, United States 
 Portersville, Indiana, an unincorporated community in Dubois County, Indiana, United States
 Portersville, Indiana, former name of Valparaiso, Indiana, city in Porter County, Indiana, United States
 Portersville, Ohio, an unincorporated village in Perry County, Ohio, United States
 Portersville, Pennsylvania, a borough in Butler County, Pennsylvania, United States
 Portersville, Tennessee, a former municipality and precursor of Atoka, Tennessee, United States
 Portersville, West Virginia, an unincorporated community

See also
Portersville Limestone, a geological formation in Ohio, United States